Indian Kanoon is an Indian law search engine. It was launched on 4 January 2008. The search engine has been meshed with the highest courts and tribunals of India to provide up-to-date judgements.

References

Further reading 
 
 

News
 
 

Domain-specific search engines
2008 establishments in India